This is a list of Argentine films of 2012

References

Films
Argentina
2012